Olli Lehtinen (27 May 1915 – 28 September 1992) was a Finnish boxer. He competed in the men's flyweight event at the 1948 Summer Olympics.

References

External links
 

1915 births
1992 deaths
Finnish male boxers
Olympic boxers of Finland
Boxers at the 1948 Summer Olympics
Sportspeople from Helsinki
Flyweight boxers